1986–87 was the seventy-fourth occasion on which the Lancashire Cup completion had been held.
Wigan won the trophy  by beating Oldham by the score of 27-6
The match was played at Knowsley Road, Eccleston, St Helens, Merseyside, (historically in the county of Lancashire). The attendance was 20,180 and receipts were £60,329.00
This was Wigan’s third appearance in three years and a second victory in what would a run of four victories and five appearances in five successive years.
The attendance was again at a very pleasing level, the third of the five year period when it would reach around the 20,000 level, and the receipts reached a new near record level

Background 

This season the total number of entrants remained at the 16 level.
With this full sixteen members there was no need for “blank” or “dummy” fixtures or any byes.

Competition and results

Round 1 
Involved  8 matches (with no byes) and 16 clubs

Round 2 - Quarter-finals 
Involved 4 matches and 8 clubs

Round 3 – Semi-finals  
Involved 2 matches and 4 clubs

Final

Teams and scorers 

Scoring - Try = four points - Goal = two points - Drop goal = one point

The road to success

Notes and comments 
1 * A record score for a match in this competition and a record defeat for Carlisle in any competition
2 * Knowsley Road was the home ground of St. Helens from 1890 to 2010. The final capacity was in the region of 18,000, although the actual record attendance was 35,695,  set on 26 December 1949, for a league game between St Helens and Wigan

See also 
1986–87 Rugby Football League season
Rugby league county cups

References

External links
Saints Heritage Society
1896–97 Northern Rugby Football Union season at wigan.rlfans.com 
Hull&Proud Fixtures & Results 1896/1897
Widnes Vikings - One team, one passion Season In Review - 1896-97
The Northern Union at warringtonwolves.org

1986 in English rugby league
RFL Lancashire Cup